General Robert Prescott (21December 1815) was a British military officer and colonial administrator. During a military career which spanned over fifty years, he participated in the Seven Years' War, the French and Indian War, and the American Revolutionary War, including key engagements such as the Montreal Campaign. He later became the Governor of Martinique and then, in 1796, Governor General of The Canadas, and the British Army's Commander-in-Chief for North America. He was recalled to England in 1799 after conflict with the Catholic Church and disputes with Anglo-Canadian colonial elites over the distribution of land in the colonies. He continued to hold his position until 1807, with his lieutenant governors acting in his absence. He died in 1815 after unsuccessful attempts to clear his name.

Biography

Modern sources generally agree that Robert Prescott was born in Lancashire in 1726 or 1727. Some sources, such as the Dictionary of Canadian Biography, claim that he was the son of a cavalry officer named Richard Prescott, though the Oxford Dictionary of National Biography says that "on what grounds [this] is not clear." Other sources also suggest that he was the brother of Colonel William Prescott, who fought in some of the same conflicts, although William Prescott was an American who was born in Massachusetts. Older sources differ from modern ones in some respects, with the 1896 Dictionary of National Biography and the 1900 Appletons' Cyclopædia of American Biography both claiming that he was born in 1725; the Dictionary of National Biography further states that "his family lost their estates owing to their opposition to the revolution of 1688."

Prescott's military career is much more well-documented than his early life. He enlisted in the British Army in 1745 and became an ensign in the 15th Regiment of Foot. On 22 January 1755, he reached the rank of captain in the 15th Foot. With the outbreak of the Seven Years' War, Prescott saw action in the 1757 British raid on Rochefort, France, and in 1758, the 15th Foot sailed for North America to participate in the French and Indian War, an ongoing conflict which had become the North American theatre of the Seven Years' War. Prescott was present at the 1758 Siege of Louisbourg. He became an aide-de-camp to General Jeffery Amherst in 1759, participating in the capture of Montreal. Afterward he served under General James Wolfe. He also delivered despatches to England announcing the fall of Fort Lévis in 1760, which was near where the town of Prescott, Ontario would later be founded and named in his honour.

In January 1761, with the Anglo-Cherokee War ongoing, the 95th Regiment of Foot was formed in South Carolina under Ralph Burton. Robert Prescott became a major in the regiment on 22 March. The regiment took the field by May 1761 near Fort Prince George, which guarded the Cherokee Path and had been successfully raided by Cherokee forces the previous year. The regiment was soon sent to the West Indies along with a number of other American regiments to participate in the second invasion of Martinique, which followed an unsuccessful attempt in 1759. Prescott became lieutenant-colonel of the 72nd Regiment of Foot in November 1762, but the regiment disbanded the following year.

Prescott reappears in the military record with the outbreak of the American Revolutionary War in 1775. With the situation in the American colonies worsening for the British government, a number of units were mustered to be sent there. On 8 September 1775, he became lieutenant-colonel of the 28th Regiment of Foot, which had participated in the Montreal Campaign during the French and Indian War. The regiment was sent to North America in May 1776. Later that year, in August, Prescott was present at the Battle of Long Island, after which the British captured New York City and Long Island from the Patriot forces. He also participated in several engagements in Westchester County, followed by the Battle of Fort Washington in November. He became a brevet-colonel on 29 August 1777. He was attached to the British expedition against Philadelphia, and two weeks later, on 11 September, he was present at the Battle of Brandywine, which was followed by the city's capture by the British.

Prescott then served in the West Indies and became Governor of Martinique in 1794.

In 1796, he became governor-in-chief of The Canadas, New Brunswick, and Nova Scotia, as well as commander of British forces in North America. In his new position, he pursued a programme of improvements to military fortifications and infrastructure, which he found to be dilapidated and unsuitable for defense against external enemies, but was hampered by financial constraints. An attempt by the British authorities to use forced labour for a road improvement scheme in Lower Canada led to widespread rioting, and the resulting unstable political situation in the colonies over the winter of 1796–97 created what historian F. Murray Greenwood characterizes as a "garrison mentality" amongst the English elite.

The possibility of an insurrection amongst the French-Canadian population, which greatly outnumbered the English, alarmed Prescott considerably. In an October 1796 letter to the British Home Secretary William Cavendish-Bentinck, 3rd Duke of Portland, he wrote that "His Majesty's English subjects here compared to the [French-Canadians] are not in a greater proportion as Seventy to Two Thousand." This thinking was encouraged by leading Anglo-Canadian elites such as Chief Justice William Osgoode and Attorney General Jonathan Sewell, who promoted the idea that the unrest was a Franco-American plot to overthrow British rule in Canada. Prescott cracked down against perceived insurrectionists, leading to the trial and execution of the Quebec City merchant David McLane, who was an American citizen. Going further, he banned the immigration of Catholic priests from France, and engaged in strict surveillance of the Roman Catholic Church, also arguing that the government should take over the estates held by the Sulpician order. However, his reluctance to directly violate the rights of Catholics led to conflict with the Anglican Bishop of Quebec, Jacob Mountain, who singlemindedly pursued Anglican supremacy over the Catholic Church.

Prescott was also faced with a refugee crisis, as many United Empire Loyalists and others who had desired to leave the newly-founded United States and settle in Canada had still not received legal title to any lands, and had either returned to the United States or began squatting on land for such a considerable duration of time as to engage in cultivation and land improvements. With responsibility for addressing the crisis falling to him as governor, Prescott devised a scheme designed to distinguish genuine settlers from land speculators by basing the size of township grants on the expenses incurred by the applicant, which also served to reward those who had begun to develop lands in anticipation of receiving a land title. This satisfied the majority of applicants, but angered speculators, as it limited their ability to profit from merely holding title to lands in Canada. Prescott began to suspect a conspiracy dating back to at least 1794 amongst members of the Executive Council, including William Osgoode, Hugh Finlay (chairman of the land committee), and John Young, to exploit their official positions to acquire large tracts of land for themselves. The Executive Council condemned Prescott's attempted solution to the land issue, leading him to believe that his suspicions had been confirmed. A military figure who was unaccustomed to politicking and perceived insubordination, Prescott lashed out against councillors, openly accusing them of land speculation and jobbery. In April 1799, attempts at reconciliation failed, and the British government recalled Prescott to England, despatching Sir Robert Milnes, 1st Baronet as lieutenant governor to manage Lower Canada in his absence. Milnes promptly permitted the Executive Council the land grants they had pursued.

After his return to England, Prescott endeavoured for some time to have an official inquiry made into his recall in order to exonerate himself. He officially remained in his position until 1807, but never returned to Lower Canada. He died on 21 December 1815 at Rose Green, West Sussex, aged about 89.

Legacy

Prescott, Ontario and Prescott County are named in his honour.

See also
 List of Governors General of Canada
 List of Lieutenant Governors of Quebec

References

External links 
 

1726 births
1815 deaths
British Army generals
British military personnel of the French and Indian War
British Army personnel of the French Revolutionary Wars
Governors of British North America
East Yorkshire Regiment officers
British Army personnel of the Seven Years' War
27th Regiment of Foot officers
72nd Highlanders officers
28th Regiment of Foot officers
British Governors of Martinique
Military personnel from Lancashire